Gagata youssoufi is a species of sisorid catfish native to India and Bangladesh.  This species grows to a length of  SL.

References
 

Sisoridae
Fish of Bangladesh
Fish of India
Fish described in 1976